Abolfazl Babadi Akasheh (born 9 March 1999) is an Iranian footballer who plays as a forward for Zob Ahan in the Persian Gulf Pro League.

On 16 August 2020 and as a loan player from Sepahan, he scored the Iran Pro League promotion goal for Aluminium Arak against Damash Gilan in Azadegan League.

On 21 Sepetmer 2020, he made his AFC Champions League debut for Sepahan against Al Ain.

Club career statistics 

Last Update:22 September 2020

References

External links 

Sepahan S.C. footballers
1999 births
Living people
Iranian footballers
Iran youth international footballers
Association football forwards